Nathanael Blair (born 15 March 2004) is an Australian footballer who plays as a forward for A-League club Western Sydney Wanderers.

Club career

APIA Leichhardt
Aged 13, Blair joined APIA in 2017, during his years in the youth teams he played for multiple age groups for the club before joining Northbridge FC in 2021. On 3 March 2022, Blair rejoined APIA for the 2022 NPL NSW season. On 11 March 2022, Blair scored on his senior club debut in a 1–0 win against Manly United.

Western Sydney Wanderers
On 22 June 2022, Blair signed a two-year scholarship deal with the Western Sydney Wanderers. He was named on the bench against Melbourne Victory, two months prior to making his league debut in a 1–1 draw against Wellington Pheonix on 10 December 2022.

References

External links
Profile at wswanderersfc.com

2004 births
Living people
Western Sydney Wanderers FC players
Australian soccer players